Times Like These was Band bassist Rick Danko's final album, a posthumous release featuring tracks from a variety of sources dating from an aborted solo project in 1993 to Danko's final live performance in Ann Arbor, Michigan just days before his death.

Those tracks recorded specifically for the project were the title track (a song Danko had written in the 1970s but had yet to find a place for), "Ripple" (suggested by the President of Breeze Hill Records, who issued the album), "All Our Past Times" (in keeping with Danko's revisiting of a song from his younger days), "This Wheel's on Fire" (a second, unfinished, revisit, it features an entirely redone arrangement by The Crowmatix and Garth Hudson), "You Can Go Home" and "People of Conscience" (both written by Tom Pacheco, the former co-written by Danko, and focusing on human rights). Of the remaining four, "Book Faded Brown" and "Let the Four Winds Blow"- the latter sung by Danko cohort Aaron Hurwitz- date from Danko's last live show on December 6, 1999, both featuring posthumous overdubbing by Hurwitz and others. "Chain Gang" dated from the sessions for The Band's High on the Hog album and featured all of the late-period members of The Band except Levon Helm and "Change Is Good" featuring Joe Walsh dated from an aborted 1993 solo project for Elektra Records.

Track listing
 "Times Like These" (Danko) – 4:19
 "Ripple" (Jerry Garcia, Robert Hunter) – 5:41
 "All Our Past Times" (Danko, Eric Clapton) – 3:46
 "Book Faded Brown" (Paul Jost) – 3:12
 "Chain Gang" (Sam Cooke) – 4:10
 "Change Is Good" (Danko, Jim Tullio, Ed Kaercher) – 4:10
 "Sip the Wine" (Danko, Tim Drummond) – 5:19
 "This Wheel's on Fire" (Danko, Bob Dylan) – 5:06
 "You Can Go Home" (Danko, Tom Pacheco) – 5:34
 "Let the Four Winds Blow" (Dave Bartholomew, Antoine "Fats" Domino) – 3:22
 "People of Conscience" (Pacheco) – 4:10

Personnel
 Richard Bell – synthesizers
 Gary Burke – drums
 Chris "Hambone" Cameron – Hammond organ
 Randy Ciarlante – drums, lead & backing vocals
 Rick Danko – bass, acoustic guitar, lead & backing vocals
 Terry Danko – bass
 Mike DeMicco – acoustic guitar, mandolin
 Mike Dunn – bass
 Jim Eppard – acoustic guitar, lap steel guitar, mandolin
 Hank Guaglianoe – drums
 Levon Helm – harmonica, mandolin
 Garth Hudson – accordion, keyboards, alto & soprano & tenor saxophones, synthesizer
 Maud Hudson – backing vocals
 Prof. Aaron "Louie" Hurwitz – accordion, bass, Hammond organ, piano, synthesizer, lead & backing vocals
 Bashiri Johnson – percussion
 Dennis Johnson – bass
 Tom Malone – baritone horn, trombone, tuba
 Greg Marsh – percussion
 Tom Pacheco – acoustic guitar
 Larry Packer – viola
 Scott Petito – bass
 Bill Ruppert – guitar
 Dean Sharp – drums
 Beth Reineke – backing vocals
 Leslie Ritter – backing vocals
 Marie Spinosa – percussion, backing vocals
 Jim Tullio – guitar, backing vocals
 Sredni Vollner – harmonica
 Joe Walsh – guitar, piano, backing vocals
 Jim Weider – dobro, acoustic & electric guitar, mandolin
 Eric Weissberg – banjo, acoustic guitar

References

Rick Danko albums
Compilation albums published posthumously
2000 compilation albums

es:Times Like These